Robert Bell, D.D. (1808-1883)  was  Archdeacon of Cashel from 1879 until his death.

The son of Robert Bell, Precentor of Emly,  he was born in Tipperary and educated at Trinity College, Dublin;  He was the Incumbent at Tipperary; Archdeacon of Waterford from 1845 to 1879; and Archdeacon of Cashel from 1879 until his death on 10 January 1883.

References 

Archdeacons of Cashel
Archdeacons of Waterford
Alumni of Trinity College Dublin
1808 births
1883 deaths
19th-century Irish Anglican priests
People from Tipperary (town)